Joe Martin is an American cartoonist.

Biography
Joe Martin was born on the south side of Chicago, Illinois. When he was 16 years old, he was married. By the time he was 20 years old, he had four children, but he also got a divorce. He then met his current wife, Marie, and they have been married for about 34 years. He also had two cats named Fluffy and Snuggles. Martin formerly lived in Lake Geneva, Wisconsin with his wife and five children, then moved to the Cape Fear area of North Carolina.

Career
In 1979, Martin debuted his first comic strip, named Tucker. Tucker emulated Martin's own beginning of his career by making it about a man who runs an employment agency. Martin has been able to accumulate about 1300 jokes yearly, and he has over 22,000 published since 1978. In 1998, it was common to find Martin's comic strip, Mr. Boffo, appear in the Washington Post.

Cartoons
Martin is the creator of comic strips "Mister Boffo", "Porterfield", "Willy 'N Ethel" and "Cats With Hands", and author of How to Hang a Spoon. In 2000 he was featured by the Guinness Book of World Records as the "World's Most Prolific Cartoonist." Willy 'N Ethel, Martin's longest running strip, was able to celebrate its twentieth anniversary in March 2001.

Exhibitions
In Joe Martin's first exhibition of his paintings, there was not one single person ready to buy one of his paintings. He was confident that by the end of his exhibition, there would not be one left on the wall. The prices of the art ranged from $12,000 to $28,000. The exhibit included ten various oil and acrylic paintings. His art often depicts the absurd and mocks the social norms of life.

References

External links 
Joe Martin at the Comiclopedia
Joe Martin at UComics

Living people
American cartoonists
Year of birth missing (living people)